Tom Marriott (born 13 December 1998) is an English footballer who plays as a midfielder for North Carolina Fusion U23.

Playing career
Marriott made his debut for Mansfield Town in a 1–0 win over Port Vale on 4 October 2016, in an EFL Trophy group stage game at Vale Park. He was released at the end of the season having failed to make any further appearances.

In 2019, he enrolled at Lander University playing college soccer. He played for USL League Two side Charlotte Eagles during the 2021 season. In March 2022, he appeared and scored for North Carolina Fusion U23 in a U.S. Open Cup match.

Style of play
In 2015, the Mansfield Town website described Marriott as a right-sided attacking midfielder who was "a creative player with an eye for goal".

Statistics

References

Living people
English footballers
Derby County F.C. players
Mansfield Town F.C. players
Association football midfielders
Charlotte Eagles players
Footballers from Chesterfield
North Carolina Fusion U23 players
Lander Bearcats men's soccer players
English expatriate footballers
USL League Two players
Expatriate soccer players in the United States
English expatriate sportspeople in the United States
1998 births